Charles Ross (or Rosse; 8 February 1667 – 5 August 1732) was a Scottish general and Member of Parliament.

Military career
Ross was born the second son of George Ross, 11th Lord Ross. He joined the British army as a cornet in the King's Own Royal Regiment of Scottish Horse some time before 1688. When Wynne's Regiment of Inniskilling Dragoons was raised in 1689, Ross joined as a captain, and served with the regiment in the Williamite War in Ireland. He went to Flanders with the regiment as lieutenant-colonel in 1694, and was appointed brevet colonel of the regiment on 16 February; when Wynne died on 15 July 1695 his colonelcy was made permanent. In 1704 he secured the title of the Royal Dragoons of Ireland for his regiment.

Ross was promoted brigadier-general on 9 March 1702, and major-general on 1 January 1704. He commanded a brigade of dragoons at the battles of Blenheim, Ramillies, Oudenarde and Malplaquet. He was further promoted to lieutenant-general on 1 January 1707, made Colonel-General of all the Dragoon Forces on 1 May 1711, and promoted to full general on 1 January 1712. He was removed from the colonelcy of the Royal Dragoons of Ireland by George I on 8 October 1715, but reappointed on 1 February 1729, holding the post until his death.

Political career
General Ross was Member of Parliament for Ross-shire from 1710 to 1722 and from 1727 to 1732. In September 1713 he was appointed Envoy Extraordinary to France, but did not take up the post.

Death
He died at Bath on 5 August 1732 and was buried at Fearn Abbey, leaving his estate of Balnagown, which he had inherited from David Ross, the 13th Laird of Balnagown, in 1711, to his great-nephew Charles Ross.

Citations

References

 Dalton, Charles (2006). The Blenheim Roll 1704. Naval & Military Press.
 Hayton, D.W., ROSSE (ROSS), Hon. Charles (1667-1732). in The History of Parliament: the House of Commons 1690-1715, 2002.
 Simpson, J. M., ROSS, Hon. Charles (d.1732), of Balnagowan, Ross. in The History of Parliament: the House of Commons 1715-1754, 1970.
 Willcox, Walter Temple, The Historical Records of the Fifth (Royal Irish) Lancers, 1908. pages iii-iv

1667 births
1732 deaths
5th Royal Irish Lancers officers
British Army generals
Members of the Parliament of Great Britain for Scottish constituencies
British MPs 1708–1710
British MPs 1710–1713
British MPs 1713–1715
British MPs 1715–1722
British MPs 1727–1734
Williamite military personnel of the Williamite War in Ireland
British military personnel of the War of the Spanish Succession
Younger sons of barons